

Bragg is an English surname of Norman origin, the Welsh equivalent of this surname is Frost or Ffrost deriving from Ymffrostgar and may refer to:

People:

A 
Alvin Bragg (born 1973), American politician, current New York County District Attorney
Andrew Bragg (born 1984), Australian senator
Art Bragg (1930–2018), American sprinter

B 
Bernard Bragg (1928–2018), deaf actor, writer, director, poet and artist
Billy Bragg (born 1957), English folk musician
Braxton Bragg (1817–1876), Confederate Civil War general for whom Fort Bragg is named

C 
 Caleb Bragg (1885–1943), American racecar driver, speedboat racer, aviation pioneer and automotive inventor
 Charles Bragg, (1930–2017), American artist
 Craig Bragg (born 1982), American football wide receiver

D 
Darren Bragg (born 1969), former Major League Baseball outfielder
Don Bragg (1935–2019), American pole vaulter and Olympic gold medalist

E 
Edward S. Bragg (1827–1912), American politician, lawyer and Union Army general from Wisconsin

J 
Jacob Bragg (born 2000), Australian long-distance runner
Janet Bragg (1907–1993), aviator and first African-American woman to hold a commercial pilot license
Jesse Bragg (1887–after 1918), Negro league baseball player
John Bragg (disambiguation), various people

K 
Ken Bragg (born 1950), member of the Arkansas House of Representatives

L 
Laura Bragg (1881–1978), American museum director
Lawrence Bragg (1890–1971), physicist and recipient of the in 1915 Nobel Prize in Physics, together with his father William H Bragg

M 
Marie-Elsa Bragg (born 1964 or 1965), English priest and writer 
Melvyn Bragg (born 1939), English broadcaster and author
Mike Bragg (born 1946), former National Football League punter

P 
Patricia Bragg (born 1929), American author and businesswoman
Paul Bragg (1895–1976), nutritionist
Philip Bragg (died 1759), Irish lieutenant-general and Member of Parliament

R 
Rick Bragg (born 1959), Pulitzer Prize-winning American author and journalist
Robert Henry Bragg Jr. (1919–2017), physicist

S 
Stephen Bragg (1923–2014), engineer

T 
Thomas Bragg (1810–1872), North Carolina politician and lawyer

W 
William Henry Bragg (1862–1942), physicist and recipient of the 1915 Nobel Prize in Physics, together with his son Lawrence Bragg

Fictional characters 
Randy Bragg, protagonist of the novel Alas, Babylon

See also
 Bragge (surname)

English-language surnames